M-Palace is a high-rise building in Brno, Czech Republic.
The building is 60 meters high and it is one of the tallest buildings in Brno.
The building consists of a sixteen-floors tower and two-floors building.
The tower is mainly used for offices and in the two floors building is a shopping mall.
There is a restaurant on the top floor of the tower with a panoramic view of the city.
Construction of the building was started in 1994 and the building was opened in 1997.
The building is located on Heršpická street.
In the near of the building are located AZ Tower and Spielberk Towers.

Gallery

References

External links 
 
 

Skyscraper office buildings in the Czech Republic
Buildings and structures in Brno
Skyscrapers in the Czech Republic
Retail buildings in the Czech Republic
1997 establishments in the Czech Republic
Commercial buildings completed in 1997
Office buildings completed in 1997
20th-century architecture in the Czech Republic